Beatrice Rana (born 22 January 1993) is an Italian pianist.

Early life 
Born in Copertino, Rana began studying piano at the age of 4, and made her orchestral debut at 9, performing Bach's Piano Concerto in F minor conducted by Francesco Libetta. She studied with Benedetto Lupo at the Nino Rota Conservatory of Music in Monopoli and Arie Vardi at the Hochschule für Musik, Theater und Medien Hannover in Hanover, Germany.

Career and recognition 
Rana won the first prize and special jury prizes at the 2011 Montreal International Piano Competition and the silver medal at the 2013 Van Cliburn International Piano Competition.

Rana is an exclusive recording artist for Warner Classics. In 2018 she was nominated for the Classic Brit Awards in the "Best Female Artist of the Year" category for her recording of Bach's Goldberg Variations.

In October 2018, Rana made her debut in Amsterdam with the Royal Concertgebouw Orchestra. On 24 and 25 September 2020, she performed Tchaikovsky's first piano concerto with the same orchestra.

On 12 March 2019, Rana made her Carnegie Hall debut, playing Chopin's Twelve Etudes, Op. 25, to rave reviews. She returned on 7 June 2019 to play Prokofiev's Piano Concerto No. 3 with the Philadelphia Orchestra. She returned again on 17 October 2019, performing Bach's D minor and F minor keyboard concertos.

Discography
Chopin: 26 Préludes - Scriabin: Sonata No. 2, Op. 19, ATMA Classique  (2012)
Schumann: Symphonic Studies, Op. 13; Ravel: Gaspard de la nuit; Bartók: Out of Doors, harmonia mundi (2013). Choc de Classica.
Prokofiev: Piano Concerto No. 2 - Tchaikovsky: Piano Concerto No. 1 with Orchestra dell'Accademia Nazionale di Santa Cecilia and Antonio Pappano, Warner Classics (2016)
J. S. Bach: Goldberg Variations, Warner Classics (2017)
Bernstein: Symphony No. 2 "The Age of Anxiety" with Orchestra dell'Accademia Nazionale di Santa Cecilia and Antonio Pappano, Warner Classics (2018)
Ravel: Miroirs and La valse - Stravinsky: Trois Movements de Petrushka and The Firebird, Warner Classics (2019). Diapason d'or, Choc de Classica.

References

External links
Beatrice Rana's official site
Beatrice Rana's Warner Classics' page

Italian classical pianists
Italian women pianists
Women classical pianists
1993 births
Living people
21st-century classical pianists
21st-century Italian musicians
Child classical musicians
21st-century Italian women musicians
21st-century women pianists
Hochschule für Musik, Theater und Medien Hannover alumni